Tufillo (Abruzzese:) is a comune and town in the Province of Chieti in the Abruzzo region of Italy. It has a population of approximately 508.

References

External links
 http://abruzzo.indettaglio.it/eng/comuni/ch/tufillo/tufillo.html

Cities and towns in Abruzzo